Kamalini Mukherji (born 17 October 1979) is an Indian vocalist who performs Bengali music, specifically, Rabindra Sangeet. Mukherji has released 12 music albums with HMV Saregama, one of the leading music labels in India.

Dakshinee Purashkar Bijoyee-Shilpi (2003) 
This album is a compilation of 18 songs by Dakshinee Purashkar awardees. This award is given by Dakshinee, a leading academy in Kolkata promoting Rabindra Sangeet, each year to exceptionally promising students of Rabindra Sangeet, across multiple reputed institutions that teach the art form.

Geetosudhar Tore (2006) 
This is Mukherji’s first individual Rabindra Sangeet album.

Rare Gems from Tagore (2010) 
This is a 3-volume compilation of rare songs by Rabindranath Tagore.

Tagore 4 2moro (2010) 
This is an experimental presentation of Rabindra Sangeet in an unconventional soundscape featuring Mukherji, Aditi Gupta, Rupankar Bagchi, and others. The music for this album has been arranged by Neel Dutt.

Eshechho Prem (2010) 
This is Mukherji’s first individual Rabindra Sangeet album with Saregama.

Bibagi Hiya (2011) 
This album is a mix of some very popular songs of Tagore along with a few of his less-heard creations.

Bandho Bhangar Chhando (2011) 
This is a selection of 10 fast-paced, rhythmic songs of Tagore.

Romancing Tagore (2012) 
Romancing Tagore is a collaborative effort between Indian and Pakistani artists, Kamalini Mukherji, Shubha Mudgal, Najam Sheraz, Debojyoti Mishra, and Indira Varma to present Tagore’s songs in Urdu. The song listed below has been sung by Mukherji and Najam Sheraz.

Priyo Rabibabu (2012) 
Adapted from the novel Ranu O Bhanu  written by Sunil Gangopadhyay, this album is a composite presentation of narration by Sutapa Bandyopadhyay and Probal Mallik, and songs by Kamalini Mukherji and Promit Sen. The music was arranged by Kalyan Sen Barat.

Brishti Ashe (2012) 
This album is a compilation of ten songs for the monsoon season.

Din-Rajani (2013) 
A collaboration between Kamalini Mukherji (vocal) and Shubhayu Sen Majumdar (esraj), this compilation presents eight songs of Tagore based on eight ragas chronologically from morning (Bhairavi) till late night (Malkauns), each preceded or followed by an esraj piece based on the same raga.

Hothat Khushi (2014) 
This album is a compilation of ten songs from primarily the Puja (devotional songs) and Prem (love songs) sections of Tagore’s work, and includes classics such as Krishnakoli Ami Tarei Boli, which also provides the title of the album.

Best of Kamalini (2016) 
This double-CD album is a compilation released by Saregama, containing some of Mukherji’s most popular songs.

References 

Mukherji, Kamalini